Gangland Odyssey is a 1990 Hong Kong action film directed by Michael Chan and starring Andy Lau, Alex Man and Chan.

Plot
When retired police detective Fan Chi-hung (Alex Man) hears that his former superior Brown's (Roger Ball) son has been kidnapped, he comes back to Hong Kong from the United States to assist in the rescue. Along with Brown's adopted son, Kit (Andy Lau), they go through several investigations and finally rescues the child, which Brown is grateful about. Fan also takes the opportunity to see his ex-lover, Shirley (Kelly Yiu). Kit also knows Shirley and gradually falls for her daughter, Cindy (Regina Kent). However, things suddenly change. It is revealed that Brown actually engulfed a huge sum of money from a Japanese company, which leads Yakuza member Hoshida (Michael Chan) to Hong Kong to find out the truth. Hoshida, who was originally named Pu, was Shirley's ex-husband when the former was a triad member in Hong Kong. When Browns learns about this relationship, he tells Fan to depart from Hong Kong and let him negotiate in Japan. Unexpectedly, Brown betrays Fan, and the Yakuza tries to kill Kit and Fan and later kills Kit and Cindy. Fan also unintentionally learns of Hoshida and Shirley's relationship and Fan decides to battle to death with the Yakuza.

Cast
Andy Lau as Kit
Alex Man as Fan Chi-hung
Michael Chan as Pu / Hoshida
Kelly Yiu as Shirley
Regina Kent as Cindy
Shing Fui-On as Maddy
Ng Man-tat as Uncle Eleven
Siu Yam-yam as Mrs. Brown
Alan Tang as Mr. Tang
Lau Yuk-kei as Cheung
Fong Yau as Uncle Pin
Sing Yan as Sisan Triad's boss
Roger Ball as Mr. Brown
Lam Shung-ching as thug
Ching Kong
Ricky Kwong
Ng Shek-long
Ng Chung-man
Kam Wai-kwong
Wong Koon-ko
Luk Chuen as Nakacho
Suen Kwok-ming as Sisan Triad's thug
James Ha as Sisan Triad's thug
Chu Tau as Cheung's thug
Ridley Tsui as assassin
Danny Chow as assassin
Wong Chi-keung as assassin
Hung Chi-sing as assassin
Hui Sze-man as Elecen's wife
Jim James as Mr Brown's party guest
Fung Man-kwong
Jack Wong
Lee Fat-yuen
Lai Sing-kwong

Theme song
Farewell Jiang Hu (别了江湖)
Composer/Lyricist: James Wong
Singer: Andy Lau

Reception

Critical
So Good Reviews gave the film a mixed review praising its hard boiled style action but stating these are the only aspects worth remembering.

The film has received a 100% on Rotten Tomatoes based on user ratings.

Box office
The film grossed HK$7,385,637 at the Hong Kong box office during its theatrical run from 13 to 26 September 1990 in Hong Kong.

See also
Andy Lau filmography

References

External links

Gangland Odyssey at Hong Kong Cinemagic

1990 films
1990 action thriller films
1990 martial arts films
Hong Kong action thriller films
Hong Kong martial arts films
Triad films
Yakuza films
Gun fu films
1990s Cantonese-language films
Films set in Hong Kong
Films shot in Hong Kong
1990s Japanese films
1990s Hong Kong films